Sengunthar Higher Secondary School is located in Erode city of Tamil Nadu, India.the school is providing the educational services for the Tamil medium & State board English Medium from 6th Standard to 12th Standard.

Infrastructure 

Sengunthar Higher Secondary School is located at the center region of the Erode city. It has more than 2500 students. It provides all the facilities for the welfare of students.

External links 
 https://web.archive.org/web/20111012223707/http://www.mpnmjec.ac.in/founder-correspondent.php

https://web.archive.org/web/20190915115135/http://www.senguntharschools.org/

See also 
 List of Educational Institutions in Erode

References 

Boys' schools in India
High schools and secondary schools in Tamil Nadu
Schools in Erode district
Education in Erode
Educational institutions established in 1944
1944 establishments in India